The 2017 CS Golden Spin of Zagreb was the 50th edition of the annual senior-level international figure skating competition held in Zagreb, Croatia. It was held at the Dom sportova on December 2017 as part of the 2017–18 ISU Challenger Series. Medals were awarded in the disciplines of men's singles, ladies' singles, pair skating, and ice dance.

Entries 
The International Skating Union published the preliminary entries on 21 November 2017.

Results

Men

Ladies

Pairs

Ice dance

References

Citations

External links 
 2017 CS Golden Spin of Zagreb at the International Skating Union
 Croatian Skating Federation

CS Golden Spin of Zagreb
2017 in Croatian sport